Stenidea floccifera is a species of beetle in the family Cerambycidae. It was described by Kolbe in 1893, originally under the genus Belodera. It is known from Kenya and Tanzania.

References

floccifera
Beetles described in 1893